The 1999 Super 12 season was the fourth season of the Super 12, contested by teams from Australia, New Zealand and South Africa. The season ran from February to May 1999, with each team playing all the others once. At the end of the regular season, the top four teams entered the playoff semi finals, with the first placed team playing the fourth and the second placed team playing the third. The winner of each semi final qualified for the final, which was contested by the Canterbury Crusaders and the Otago Highlanders at Carisbrook, Dunedin. The Crusaders won 24 – 19 to win their second Super 12 title.

Teams
The 1999 Super 12 competition consisted of 12 teams, four from South Africa, three from Australia and five from New Zealand.
 ACT Brumbies (Australia)
 Auckland Blues (New Zealand)
 Canterbury Crusaders (New Zealand)
 Cats (South Africa)
 Bulls (South Africa)
 Otago Highlanders (New Zealand)
 Queensland Reds (Australia)
 Sharks (South Africa)
 Stormers (South Africa)
 Waikato Chiefs (New Zealand)
 Waratahs (Australia)
 Wellington Hurricanes (New Zealand)

Table

Results

Round 1

Round 2

Round 3

Round 4

Round 5

Round 6

Round 7

Round 8

Round 9

Round 10

Round 11

Round 12

Finals

Semi finals

Grand final

References

Further reading
McIlraith, M. (2005).Ten Years of Super 12, Auckland: Hodder Moa. 

 
1999
 
 
 
1999 rugby union tournaments for clubs